The discography of DJ Jazzy Jeff & the Fresh Prince consists of five studio albums, four compilations and 18 singles.

Albums

Studio albums

Compilation albums

Singles

References

Discographies of American artists
Hip hop group discographies